Sirco  may refer to:
 Rhombicuboctahedron
 Sirco (potato), a potato variety